Ivan Rudež (born 22 December 1979) is a Croatian professional basketball coach, currently serving as head coach for Kaposvári KK of the Nemzeti Bajnokság I/A, the top league in Hungary.

Coaching career
Rudež started as a coach at KK Zrinjevac in 2004, where he coached both U18 and senior teams. In 2007, he went to Slovakia, where he coached BC Prievidza until 2010. After that, Rudež was named an assistant coach of the Croatian club Cedevita. 

In the summer of 2011, Rudež took over BC Vienna of the Austrian Bundesliga as the head coach. After compiling a record of three wins and six losses in the Austrian top flight he parted ways with the club in November 2011 and then moved to Cibona where he served as assistant coach to Jasmin Repeša. 

In 2012, Rudež signed as the head coach with the Swiss side Lions de Genève, where he worked until 2016. He was awarded Coach of the Year twice, and won two national championships and three national cup titles. 

Between 2016 and 2018, Rudež led the Slovakia men's national team.

In November 2018, Rudež accepted the position as the head coach of the PS Karlsruhe Lions in the German second-tier ProA league. He guided the team to the playoffs in 2018–19, where they lost to top-seeded Chemnitz in the quarter-finals. He was sacked in early Februar 2020. At that time, the Karlsruhe team was 15th of 17 teams in the ProA league having won seven of 22 games that season.  

On 17 April 2020, Rudež signed a three-year deal with Donar in the Netherlands. On 13 April 2021, he was fired by the club following a 70-96 loss to ZZ Leiden. At that time, the team ranked third in the Dutch Basketball League standings, but had won only two of the previous seven league games.

In June 2022, he was appointed as head coach of Kaposvári KK of the Hungarian league (Nemzeti Bajnokság I/A).

Personal life
His younger brother Damjan is a professional basketball player who has played with the Indiana Pacers, Minnesota Timberwolves and Orlando Magic in the National Basketball Association (NBA).

References 

1979 births
Croatian basketball coaches
Living people
Sportspeople from Zagreb
Donar (basketball club) coaches